is a Japanese music composer and arranger who has been responsible for producing and composing soundtracks, including opening and ending sequence themes for various anime, tokusatsu and video game projects in the 1980s, 1990s, and 2000s, mostly related to the Dragon Ball franchise. He has worked on soundtracks of various Dragon Ball video games.

Yamamoto has also composed background music for Dragon Ball Z Kai, a revamped version of the anime series Dragon Ball Z. On March 9, 2011, Toei Animation publicly acknowledged that many of Yamamoto's musical works for the series infringed upon unidentified third-party copyrights. As a result, Toei removed Yamamoto and replaced his compositions with those from the original Dragon Ball and Dragon Ball Z series written by Shunsuke Kikuchi. The plagiarism of these works have been known to fans since May 2010. Due to the discovery of plagiarism in his compositions by Toei, they were replaced in Dragon Ball Z: Budokai HD Collection and later copies of Dragon Ball: Raging Blast 2. Since then, a limited pre-order bonus releases, based on the Super Famicom games of Dragon Ball Z: Super Butōden (Switch version) and Dragon Ball Z: Super Butōden 2 (3DS version) would replace the music in 16bit era.

Works

References

External links
 

1958 births
Anime composers
Japanese composers
Japanese film score composers
Japanese male composers
Japanese male film score composers
Japanese music arrangers
Living people
People involved in plagiarism controversies
Video game composers